Frank J. Yurco (July 31, 1944 – February 6, 2004) was an Egyptologist from Chicago.

References

1944 births
2004 deaths
20th-century American archaeologists
21st-century American archaeologists
American Egyptologists
Scientists from Chicago